Firass Dirani (born 1984) is an Australian film and television actor.

Early life
Dirani was born in Sydney in 1984, and is of Lebanese descent.

Career
Dirani pursued his acting career in Hollywood before receiving a call to play the role of John Ibrahim in Underbelly: The Golden Mile. In April 2010, Dirani was named Cleo Bachelor of the Year.

In 2020, it was announced Dirani would be participating the Seven Network's reality program SAS Australia.

Filmography

Film
 Pitch Black (2000) as Ali
 Lost (2000) as John Savvides
 MI7 (2003) as Special Agent
 Change (2003) as Joe Change
 The Marine (2006) as Rebel Leader
 The Black Balloon (2008) as Russell
 Crooked Business (2008) as 'Stand-Up' Stevie
 The Combination (2009) as Charlie
 Killer Elite (2011) as Bakhait
 Last Dance (2012) as Sadiq
 Hacksaw Ridge (2016) as Vito Rinnelli
 Science Fiction Volume One: The Osiris Child (2016) as Carmel

Television
 Children's Hospital (1997) as Marc
 Home and Away (1998) as Billy
 The Potato Factory (2000) Mini Series as David Solomon
 My Husband, My Killer as Butch Kalajzich
 White Collar Blue Episode #1.7 (2002) as Nick Zenopoulos
 All Saints Suspicious Minds (2003) as Joe Malouf
 Small Claims: White Wedding (2005) as Benny
 The Silence (2006) as Anthony
 Power Rangers Mystic Force (2006) as Nick Russell, Red Mystic Ranger
 Kick (2007) as Amen Salim
 East West 101 (2007) as Telal
 Underbelly: The Golden Mile (2010) as John Ibrahim
 The Straits (2012) as Gary Montebello
 House Husbands (2012–2017) as Justin
 Mr Inbetween (2018) as Davros
  SAS Australia (2020) as himself

Theatre
 Sydney Dream Ball (2003) as Aerial Acrobat
 Stories (2003)
 A Midsummer Night's Dream (2003) as Puck
 Kid Stakes/Other Times (2003)
 The Tempest (2004) as Caliban

References

External links
 

1984 births
Male actors from Sydney
Australian male film actors
Australian people of Lebanese descent
Living people
Logie Award winners